Peter Hoeher from the university of Kiel, Germany was named Fellow of the Institute of Electrical and Electronics Engineers (IEEE) in 2014 for contributions to decoding and detection that include reliability information.

References

Fellow Members of the IEEE
Living people
Year of birth missing (living people)
Place of birth missing (living people)
Academic staff of the University of Kiel